James Joseph McCarter (19 March 1923 – 22 August 2002) was a Scottish professional footballer who played in the Football League for Mansfield Town and Sheffield Wednesday.

References

1923 births
2002 deaths
Scottish footballers
Association football forwards
English Football League players
Sheffield Wednesday F.C. players
Mansfield Town F.C. players
Vale of Clyde F.C. players
Weymouth F.C. players